Villefranche-de-Rouergue is a railway station in Villefranche-de-Rouergue, Occitanie, France. The station is on the Brive-Toulouse (via Capdenac) line. The station is served by TER (local) services operated by SNCF.

Train services
The following services currently call at Villefranche-de-Rouergue:
local service (TER Occitanie) Toulouse–Figeac–Aurillac

References

Railway stations in Aveyron